Romance or romantic love is a feeling of love for, or a strong attraction towards another person, and the courtship behaviors undertaken by an individual to express those overall feelings and resultant emotions.

The Wiley Blackwell Encyclopedia of Family Studies states that "Romantic love, based on the model of mutual attraction and on a connection between two people that bonds them as a couple, creates the conditions for overturning the model of family and marriage that it engenders." This indicates that romantic love can be the founding of attraction between two people. This term was primarily used by the "western countries after the 1800s were socialized into, love is the necessary prerequisite for starting an intimate relationship and represents the foundation on which to build the next steps in a family."

Alternatively, Collins Dictionary describes romantic love as "an intensity and idealization of a love relationship, in which the other is imbued with extraordinary virtue, beauty, etc., so that the relationship overrides all other considerations, including material ones."

Although the emotions and sensations of romantic love are widely associated with sexual attraction, romantic feelings can exist without expectation of physical consummation and be subsequently expressed. In certain cases, romance could even be interpreted as a normal friendship. Historically, the term romance originates with the medieval ideal of chivalry as set out in the literature of chivalric romance.

General definitions 
Bode & Kushnick undertook a comprehensive review of romantic love from a biological perspective in 2021. They considered the psychology of romantic love, its mechanisms, development across the lifespan, functions, and evolutionary history. Based on the content of that review, they proposed a biological definition of  romantic love:

"Romantic love is a motivational state typically associated with a desire for long-term mating with a particular individual. It occurs across the lifespan and is associated with distinctive cognitive, emotional, behavioral, social, genetic, neural, and endocrine activity in both sexes. Throughout much of the life course, it serves mate choice, courtship, sex, and pair-bonding functions. It is a suite of adaptations and by-products that arose sometime during the recent evolutionary history of humans."

Anthropologist Charles Lindholm defined love as "any intense attraction that involves the idealization of the other, within an erotic context, with expectation of enduring sometime into the future". Romance is a feeling of love and attraction, that people currently like and want to continue in the future.

Historical usage 

The word "romance" comes from the French vernacular where initially it indicated a verse narrative.  The word was originally an adverb of Latin origin, "romanicus", meaning "of the Roman style". European medieval vernacular tales, epics, and ballads generally dealt with chivalric adventure, not bringing in the concept of love until late into the seventeenth century. The word romance developed other meanings, such as the early nineteenth century Spanish and Italian definitions of "adventurous" and "passionate", which could intimate both "love affair" and "idealistic quality".

Anthropologists such as Claude Lévi-Strauss show that there were complex forms of courtship in ancient as well as contemporary primitive societies. There may not be evidence, however, that members of such societies formed loving relationships distinct from their established customs in a way that would parallel modern romance. Marriages were often arranged, but the wishes of those to be wed were considered, as affection was important to primitive tribes.

In the majority of primitive societies studied by the anthropologists, the extramarital and premarital relations between men and women were completely free. The members of the temporary couples were sexually attracted to each other more than to anyone else, but in all other respects their relationships had not demonstrated the characteristics of romantic love. In the book of Boris Shipov Theory of Romantic Love the corresponding evidences of anthropologists have been collected. Lewis H. Morgan: "the passion of love was unknown among the barbarians. They are below the sentiment, which is the offspring of civilization and super added refinement of love was unknown among the barbarians." Margaret Mead: "Romantic love as it occurs in our civilisation, inextricably bound up with ideas of monogamy, exclusiveness, jealousy and undeviating fidelity does not occur in Samoa." Bronislaw Malinowski: "Though the social code does not favour romance, romantic elements and imaginative personal attachments are not altogether absent in Trobriand courtship and marriage."

One should notice that the phenomenon which B.Malinowski calls love, actually has very little in common with the European love: "Thus there is nothing roundabout in a Trobriand wooing; nor do they seek full personal relations, with sexual possession only as a consequence. Simply and directly a meeting is asked for with the avowed intention of sexual gratification. If the invitation is accepted, the satisfaction of the boy's desire eliminates the romantic frame of mind, the craving for the unattainable and mysterious." "an important point is that the pair's community of interest is limited to the sexual relation only. The couple share a bed and nothing else. ... there are no services to be mutually rendered, they have no obligation to help each other in any way..."

The aborigines of Mangaia island of Polynesia, who mastered the English language, used the word "love" with a completely different meaning as compared to that which is usual for the person brought up in the European culture. Donald S.Marshall: "Mangaian informants and co-workers were quite interested in the European concept of "love". English-speaking Mangaians had previously used the term only in a physical sense of sexual desire; to say "I love you" in English to another person was tantamount to saying "I want to copulate with you." The components of affection and companionship, which may characterize the European use of the term, puzzled the Mangaians when we discussed the term." "The principal findings that one can draw from an analysis of emotional components of sexual relationship feelings on Mangaia are:
 There is no cultural connection between a willingness to copulate with a person and any feeling of affection or liking or admiration between copulating partners.
 The degree of "passion" between two individuals in sexual relationships is not related to an emotional involvement but to degrees of instruction in, and use of, sexual techniques."

Nathaniel Branden claims that by virtue of "the tribal mentality,” "in primitive cultures the idea of romantic love did not exist at all. Passionate individual attachments are evidently seen as threatening to tribal values and tribal authority." Dr. Audrey Richards, an anthropologist who lived among the Bemba of Northern Rhodesia in the 1930s, once related to a group of them an English folk-fable about a young prince who climbed glass mountains, crossed chasms, and fought dragons, all to obtain the hand of a maiden he loved. The Bemba were plainly bewildered, but remained silent. Finally an old chief spoke up, voicing the feelings of all present in the simplest of questions: "Why not take another girl?" he asked.

The earliest recorded marriages in Mesopotamia, Greece, Rome, and among Hebrews were used to secure alliances and produce offspring. It was not until the Middle Ages that love began to be a real part of marriage. The marriages that did arise outside of arranged marriage were most often spontaneous relationships.  In Ladies of the Leisure Class, Rutgers University professor Bonnie G. Smith depicts courtship and marriage rituals that may be viewed as oppressive to modern people. She writes, "When the young women of the Nord married, they did so without illusions of love and romance. They acted within a framework of concern for the reproduction of bloodlines according to financial, professional, and sometimes political interests."

Anthony Giddens, in The Transformation of Intimacy: Sexuality, Love and Eroticism in Modern Society, states that romantic love introduced the idea of a narrative to an individual's life, and telling a story is a root meaning of the term romance. According to Giddens, the rise of romantic love more or less coincided with the emergence of the novel. It was then that romantic love, associated with freedom and therefore the ideals of romantic love, created the ties between freedom and self-realization.

David R. Shumway states that "the discourse of intimacy" emerged in the last third of the 20th century, intended to explain how marriage and other relationships worked, and making the specific case that emotional closeness is much more important than passion, with intimacy and romance coexisting.

One example of the changes experienced in relationships in the early 21st century was explored by Giddens regarding homosexual relationships. According to Giddens, since homosexuals were not able to marry they were forced to pioneer more open and negotiated relationships. These kinds of relationships then permeated the heterosexual population.

The origin of romantic love 
Boris Shipov hypothesizes that "those psychological mechanisms that give rise to limerence or romantic love between a man and a woman [arise] as a product of the contradiction between sexual desire and the morality of a monogamous society, which impedes the realization of this attraction."   

In F. Engels book, The Origin of the Family, Private Property and the State: "monogamy was the only known form of the family under which modern sex love could develop, it does not follow that this love developed, or even predominantly, within it as the mutual love of the spouses. The whole nature of strict monogamian marriage under male domination ruled this out."  Sigmund Freud stated, "It can easily be shown that the psychical value of erotic needs is reduced as soon as their satisfaction becomes easy. An obstacle is required in order to heighten libido; and where natural resistances to satisfaction have not been sufficient men have at all times erected conventional ones so as to be able to enjoy love. This is true both of individuals and of nations. In times in which there were no difficulties standing in the way of sexual satisfaction, such as perhaps during the decline of the ancient civilizations, love became worthless and life empty."

Popularization of the term "Romance" 
The conception of romantic love was popularized in Western culture by the concept of courtly love. Chevaliers, or knights in the Middle Ages, engaged in what were usually non-physical and non-marital relationships with women of nobility whom they served. These relations were highly elaborate and ritualized in a complexity that was steeped in a framework of tradition, which stemmed from theories of etiquette derived out of chivalry as a moral code of conduct.

Courtly love and the notion of domnei were often the subjects of troubadours, and could be typically found in artistic endeavors such as lyrical narratives and poetic prose of the time. Since marriage was commonly nothing more than a formal arrangement, courtly love sometimes permitted expressions of emotional closeness that may have been lacking from the union between husband and wife. In terms of courtly love, "lovers" did not necessarily refer to those engaging in sexual acts, but rather, to the act of caring and to emotional intimacy.

The bond between a knight and his Lady, or the woman of typically high stature of whom he served, may have escalated psychologically but seldom ever physically. For knighthood during the Middle Ages, the intrinsic importance of a code of conduct was in large part as a value system of rules codified as a guide to aid a knight in his capacity as champion of the downtrodden, but especially in his service to the Lord.

In the context of dutiful service to a woman of high social standing, ethics designated as a code were effectively established as an institution to provide a firm moral foundation by which to combat the idea that unfit attentions and affections were to ever be tolerated as "a secret game of trysts" behind closed doors. Therefore, a knight trained in the substance of "chivalry" was instructed, with especial emphasis, to serve a lady most honorably, with purity of heart and mind. To that end, he committed himself to the welfare of both Lord and Lady with unwavering discipline and devotion, while at the same time, presuming to uphold core principles set forth in the code by the religion by which he followed.

Religious meditations upon the Virgin Mary were partially responsible for the development of chivalry as an ethic and lifestyle:  the concept of the honor of a lady and knightly devotion to her, coupled with an obligatory respect for all women, factored prominently as central to the very identity of medieval knighthood. As knights were increasingly emulated, eventual changes were reflected in the inner-workings of feudal society. Members of the aristocracy were schooled in the principles of chivalry, which facilitated important changes in attitudes regarding the value of women.

Behaviorally, a knight was to regard himself towards a lady with a transcendence of premeditated thought—his virtue ingrained within his character. A chevalier was to conduct himself always graciously, bestowing upon her the utmost courtesy and attentiveness. He was to echo shades of this to all women, regardless of class, age, or status. Over time, the concept of chivalry and the notion of the courtly gentleman became synonymous with the ideal of how love and romance should exist between the sexes. Through the timeless popularization in art and literature of tales of knights and princesses, kings and queens, a formative and long standing (sub)consciousness helped to shape relationships between men and women.

De amore or The Art of Courtly Love, as it is known in English, was written in the 12th century. The text is widely misread as permissive of extramarital affairs. However, it is useful to differentiate the physical from without: romantic love as separate and apart from courtly love when interpreting such topics as: "Marriage is no real excuse for not loving", "He who is not jealous cannot love", "No one can be bound by a double love", and "When made public love rarely endures".

Some believe that romantic love evolved independently in multiple cultures. For example, in an article presented by Henry Grunebaum, he argues "therapists mistakenly believe that romantic love is a phenomenon unique to Western cultures and first expressed by the troubadours of the Middle Ages."

The more current and Western traditional terminology meaning "court as lover" or the general idea of "romantic love" is believed to have originated in the late nineteenth and early twentieth centuries, primarily from that of the French culture. This idea is what has spurred the connection between the words "romantic" and "lover", thus coining English phrases for romantic love such as "loving like the Romans do". The precise origins of such a connection are unknown, however. Although the word "romance" or the equivalents thereof may not have the same connotation in other cultures, the general idea of "romantic love" appears to have crossed cultures and been accepted as a concept at one point in time or another.

Types 
Romantic love is contrasted with platonic love, which in all usages precludes sexual relations, yet only in the modern usage does it take on a fully nonsexual sense, rather than the classical sense, in which sexual drives are sublimated.

Unrequited love can be romantic in different ways: comic, tragic, or in the sense that sublimation itself is comparable to romance, where the spirituality of both art and egalitarian ideals is combined with strong character and emotions. Unrequited love is typical of the period of romanticism, but the term is distinct from any romance that might arise within it.

Romantic love may also be classified according to two categories, "popular romance" and "divine or spiritual" romance:

Popular romance Popular romance may include, but is not limited to the following types: idealistic, normal intense (such as the emotional aspect of "falling in love"), predictable as well as unpredictable, consuming (meaning consuming of time, energy and emotional withdrawals and bids), intense but out of control (such as the aspect of "falling out of love") material and commercial (such as societal gain mentioned in a later section of this article), physical and sexual, and finally grand and demonstrative.
Divine (or spiritual) romance Divine (spiritual) romance may include, but is not limited to these following types: realistic, as well as plausible unrealistic, optimistic as well as pessimistic (depending upon the particular beliefs held by each person within the relationship.), abiding (e.g. the theory that each person had a predetermined stance as an agent of choice; such as "choosing a husband" or "choosing a soul mate".), non-abiding (e.g. the theory that each person do not choose their actions, and therefore their romantic love involvement has been drawn from sources outside of themselves), predictable as well as unpredictable, self-control (such as obedience and sacrifice within the context of the relationship) or lack thereof (such as disobedience within the context of the relationship), emotional and personal, soulful (in the theory that the mind, soul, and body, are one connected entity), intimate, and infinite (such as the idea that love itself or the love of a God's "unconditional" love is or could be everlasting).

Philosophy

Plato 

Greek philosophers and authors have had many theories of love. Some of these theories are presented in Plato's Symposium. Six Athenian friends, including Socrates, drink wine and each give a speech praising the deity Eros. When his turn comes, Aristophanes says in his mythical speech that sexual partners seek each other because they are descended from beings with spherical torsos, two sets of human limbs, genitalia on each side, and two faces back to back. Their three forms included the three permutations of pairs of gender (i.e. one masculine and masculine, another feminine and feminine, and the third masculine and feminine) and they were split by the gods to thwart the creatures' assault on heaven, recapitulated, according to the comic playwright, in other myths such as the Aloadae.

This story is relevant to modern romance partly because of the image of reciprocity it shows between the sexes. In the final speech before Alcibiades arrives, Socrates gives his encomium of love and desire as a lack of being, namely, the being or form of beauty.

René Girard 

Though there are many theories of romantic love—such as that of Robert Sternberg, in which it is merely a mean combining liking and sexual desire—the major theories involve far more insight. For most of the 20th century, Freud's theory of the family drama dominated theories of romance and sexual relationships. This gave rise to a few counter-theories. Theorists like Deleuze counter Freud and Jacques Lacan by attempting to return to a more naturalistic philosophy:

René Girard argues that romantic attraction is a product of jealousy and rivalry—particularly in a triangular form.

Girard, in any case, downplays romance's individuality in favor of jealousy and the love triangle, arguing that romantic attraction arises primarily in the observed attraction between two others. A natural objection is that this is circular reasoning, but Girard means that a small measure of attraction reaches a critical point insofar as it is caught up in mimesis. Shakespeare's plays A Midsummer Night's Dream, As You Like It, and The Winter's Tale are the best known examples of competitive-induced romance.

Girard's theory of mimetic desire is controversial because of its alleged sexism. This view has to some extent supplanted its predecessor, Freudian Oedipal theory. It may find some spurious support in the supposed attraction of women to aggressive men. As a technique of attraction, often combined with irony, it is sometimes advised that one feign toughness and disinterest, but it can be a trivial or crude idea to promulgate to men, and it is not given with much understanding of mimetic desire in mind. Instead, cultivating a spirit of self-sacrifice, coupled with an attitude of appreciation or contemplation, directed towards the other of one's attractions, constitutes the ideals of what we consider to be true romantic love. Mimesis is always the desire to possess, in renouncing it we offer ourselves as a sacrificial gift to the other.

Mimetic desire is often challenged by feminists, such as Toril Moi, who argue that it does not account for the woman as inherently desired.

Though the centrality of rivalry is not itself a cynical view, it does emphasize the mechanical in love relations. In that sense, it does resonate with capitalism and cynicism native to post-modernity. Romance in this context leans more on fashion and irony, though these were important for it in less emancipated times. Sexual revolutions have brought change to these areas. Wit or irony therefore encompass an instability of romance that is not entirely new but has a more central social role, fine-tuned to certain modern peculiarities and subversion originating in various social revolutions, culminating mostly in the 1960s.

Arthur Schopenhauer 

The process of courtship also contributed to Arthur Schopenhauer's pessimism, despite his own romantic success, and he argued that to be rid of the challenge of courtship would drive people to suicide with boredom. Schopenhauer theorized that individuals seek partners looking for a "complement" or completing of themselves in a partner, as in the cliché that "opposites attract", but with the added consideration that both partners manifest this attraction for the sake of the species:

But what ultimately draws two individuals of different sex exclusively to each other with such power is the will-to-live which manifests itself in the whole species, and here anticipates, in the individual that these two can produce, an objectification of its true nature corresponding to its aims.
—World as Will and Representation, Volume 2, Chapter XLIV

Other philosophers 

Later modern philosophers such as La Rochefoucauld, David Hume and Jean-Jacques Rousseau also focused on morality, but desire was central to French thought and Hume himself tended to adopt a French worldview and temperament. Desire in this milieu meant a very general idea termed "the passions", and this general interest was distinct from the contemporary idea of "passionate" now equated with "romantic". Love was a central topic again in the subsequent movement of Romanticism, which focused on such things as absorption in nature and the absolute, as well as platonic and unrequited love in German philosophy and literature.

French philosopher Gilles Deleuze linked this concept of love as a lack mainly to Sigmund Freud, and Deleuze often criticized it.

American views of romantic love 
Victor C. De Munck and David B. Kronenfeld conducted a study named "Romantic Love in the United States: Applying Cultural Models Theory and Methods". This study was conducted through an investigation of two cultural model cases. It states that in America, "we have a rather and dynamic cultural model that is falsifiable and predictive of successful love relationships." Which supports that is popular for American people to successfully share feelings of romanticism with each other's partners. It describes American culture by stating: "The model is unique in that it combines passion with comfort and friendship as properties of romantic love." One of its main contributions is advising the reader that "For successful romantic love relations, a person would feel excited about meeting their beloved; make passionate and intimate love as opposed to only physical love; feel comfortable with the beloved, behaving in a companionable, friendly way with one's partner; listen to the other's concerns, offering to help out in various ways if necessary; and, all the while, keeping a mental ledger of the degree to which altruism and passion are mutual."

Literature 

Shakespeare and Søren Kierkegaard share a similar viewpoint that marriage and romance are not harmoniously in tune with each other. In Shakespeare's Measure for Measure, for example, "...there has not been, nor is there at this point, any display of affection between Isabella and the Duke, if by affection we mean something concerned with sexual attraction. The two at the end of the play love each other as they love virtue." In Romeo and Juliet, in saying "all combined, save what thou must combine By holy marriage", Romeo implies that it is not marriage with Juliet that he seeks but simply to be joined with her romantically.

Kierkegaard addressed these ideas in works such as Either/Or and Stages on Life's Way:

In his 2008 book How to Make Good Decisions and Be Right All the Time, British writer Iain King tried to establish rules for romance  applicable across most cultures.  He concluded on six rules, including:
 Do not flirt with someone unless you mean it.
 Do not pursue people who you are not interested in, or who are not interested in you.
 In general, express your affection or uncertainty clearly, unless there is a special reason not to.

Psychology 

Many theorists attempt to analyze the process of romantic love.

Anthropologist Helen Fisher, in her book Why We Love, uses brain scans to show that love is the product of a chemical reaction in the brain. Norepinephrine and dopamine, among other brain chemicals, are responsible for excitement and bliss in humans as well as non-human animals. Fisher uses MRI to study the brain activity of a person "in love" and she concludes that love is a natural drive as powerful as hunger.

Psychologist Karen Horney in her article "The Problem of the Monogamous Ideal", indicates that the overestimation of love leads to disillusionment; the desire to possess the partner results in the partner wanting to escape; and the friction against sex result in non-fulfillment. Disillusionment plus the desire to escape plus non-fulfillment result in a secret hostility, which causes the other partner to feel alienated. Secret hostility in one and secret alienation in the other cause the partners to secretly hate each other. This secret hate often leads one or the other or both to seek love objects outside the marriage or relationship.

Psychologist Harold Bessell in his book The Love Test, reconciles the opposing forces noted by the above researchers and shows that there are two factors that determine the quality of a relationship. Bessell proposes that people are drawn together by a force he calls "romantic attraction", which is a combination of genetic and cultural factors. This force may be weak or strong and may be felt to different degrees by each of the two love partners. The other factor is "emotional maturity", which is the degree to which a person is capable of providing good treatment in a love relationship. It can thus be said that an immature person is more likely to overestimate love, become disillusioned, and have an affair whereas a mature person is more likely to see the relationship in realistic terms and act constructively to work out problems.

Romantic love, in the abstract sense of the term, is traditionally considered to involve a mix of emotional and sexual desire for another as a person. However, Lisa M. Diamond, a University of Utah psychology professor, proposes that sexual desire and romantic love are functionally independent and that romantic love is not intrinsically oriented to same-gender or other-gender partners. She also proposes that the links between love and desire are bidirectional as opposed to unilateral. Furthermore, Diamond does not state that one's sex has priority over another sex (a male or female) in romantic love because her theory suggests it is as possible for someone who is homosexual to fall in love with someone of the other gender as for someone who is heterosexual to fall in love with someone of the same gender. In her 2012 review of this topic, Diamond emphasized that what is true for men may not be true for women. According to Diamond, in most men sexual orientation is fixed and most likely innate, but in many women sexual orientation may vary from 0 to 6 on the Kinsey scale and back again.

Martie Haselton, a psychologist at UCLA, considers romantic love a "commitment device" or mechanism that encourages two humans to form a lasting bond. She has explored the evolutionary rationale that has shaped modern romantic love and has concluded that long-lasting relationships are helpful to ensure that children reach reproductive age and are fed and cared for by two parents. Haselton and her colleagues have found evidence in their experiments that suggest love's adaptation. The first part of the experiments consists of having people think about how much they love someone and then suppress thoughts of other attractive people. In the second part of the experiment the same people are asked to think about how much they sexually desire those same partners and then try to suppress thoughts about others. The results showed that love is more efficient in pushing out those rivals than sex.

Research by the University of Pavia suggests that romantic love lasts for about a year (similar to limerence) before being replaced by a more stable, non-passionate "companionate love". In companionate love, changes occur from the early stage of love to when the relationship becomes more established and romantic feelings seem to end. However, research from Stony Brook University in New York suggests that some couples keep romantic feelings alive for much longer.

Attachment patterns

Attachment styles that people develop as children can influence the way that they interact with partners in adult relationships, with secure attachment styles being associated with healthier and more trusting relationships than avoidant or anxious attachment styles. Hazen and Shaver found that adult romantic attachment styles were similar to the categories of secure, avoidant, and anxious that had previously been studied in children's attachments to their caregivers, demonstrating that attachment styles are stable across the lifespan. Later on, researchers distinguished between dismissive avoidant attachment and fearful avoidant attachment. Others have found that secure adult attachment, leading to the ability for intimacy and confidence in relationship stability, is characterized by low attachment-related anxiety and avoidance, while the fearful style is high on both dimensions, the dismissing style is low on anxiety and high on avoidance, and the preoccupied style is high on anxiety and low on avoidance.

Romantic love definition/operationalization 
Singer (1984a, 1984b, 1987) first defined love based on four Greek terms: eros, meaning the search for beauty; philia, the feelings of affection in close friendships, nomos, the submission of and obedience to higher or divine powers, and agape, the bestowal of love and affection for the divine powers. While Singer did believe that love was important to world culture, he did not believe that romantic love played a major role (Singer, 1987). However, Susan Hendrick and Clyde Hendrick at Texas Tech University (1992, 2009) have theorized that romantic love will play an increasingly important cultural role in the future, as it is considered an important part of living a fulfilling life. They also theorized that love in long-term romantic relationships has only been the product of cultural forces that came to fruition within the past 300 years. By cultural forces, they mean the increasing prevalence of individualistic ideologies, which are the result of an inward shift of many cultural worldviews.

Passionate and companionate love 
Researchers have determined that romantic love is a complex emotion that can be divided into either passionate or companionate forms. Berscheid and Walster (1978) and Hatfield (1988) found that these two forms can co-exist, either simultaneously or intermittently. Passionate love is an arousal-driven emotion that often gives people extreme feelings of happiness, and can also give people feelings of anguish. Companionate love is a form that creates a steadfast bond between two people, and gives people feelings of peace. Researchers have described the stage of passionate love as "being on cocaine", since during that stage the brain releases the same neurotransmitter, dopamine, as when cocaine is being used. It is also estimated that passionate love (as with limerence) lasts for about twelve to eighteen months.

Robert Firestone, a psychologist, has a theory of the fantasy bond, which is what is mostly created after the passionate love has faded. A couple may start to feel comfortable with each other to the point that they see each other as simply companions or protectors, but yet think that they are still in love with each other. The results to the fantasy bond is the leading to companionate love.
Hendrick and Hendrick (1995) studied college students who were in the early stages of a relationship and found that almost half reported that their significant other was their closest friend, providing evidence that both passionate and companionate love exist in new relationships. Conversely, in a study of long-term marriages, Contreras, Hendrick, and Hendrick (1996) found that couples endorsed measures of both companionate love and passionate love and that passionate love was the strongest predictor of marital satisfaction, showing that both types of love can endure throughout the years.

The triangular theory of love 
Psychologist Robert Sternberg (1986) developed the triangular theory of love. He theorized that love is a combination of three main components: passion (physical arousal); intimacy (psychological feelings of closeness); and commitment (the sustaining of a relationship). He also theorized that the different combinations of these three components could yield up to seven different forms of love. These include popularized forms such as romantic love (intimacy and passion) and consummate love (passion, intimacy, and commitment). The other forms are liking (intimacy), companionate love (intimacy and commitment), empty love (commitment), fatuous love (passion and commitment), and infatuation (passion).
Studies on Sternberg's theory love found that intimacy most strongly predicted marital satisfaction in married couples, with passion also being an important predictor (Silberman, 1995). On the other hand, Acker and Davis (1992) found that commitment was the strongest predictor of relationship satisfaction, especially for long-term relationships.

The self-expansion theory of romantic love 
Researchers Arthur and Elaine Aron (1986) theorized that humans have a basic drive to expand their self-concepts. Further, their experience with Eastern concepts of love caused them to believe that positive emotions, cognitions, and relationships in romantic behaviors all drive the expansion of a person's self-concept. A study following college students for 10 weeks showed that those students who fell in love over the course of the investigation reported higher feelings of self-esteem and self efficacy than those who did not (Aron, Paris, and Aron, 1995).

Mindful relationships 
Gottman studies the components of a flourishing romantic relationship have been studied in the lab (1994; Gottman & Silver, 1999). He used physiological and behavioral measures during couples' interactions to predict relationship success and found that five positive interactions to one negative interaction are needed to maintain a healthy relationship. He established a therapy intervention for couples that focused on civil forms of disapproval, a culture of appreciation, acceptance of responsibility for problems, and self-soothing (Gottman, Driver, & Tabares, 2002).

Relationship behaviors 
Recent research suggests that romantic relationships impact daily behaviors and people are influenced by the eating habits of their romantic partners. Specifically, in the early stages of romantic relationships, women are more likely to be influenced by the eating patterns (i.e., healthiness/unhealthiness) of men. However, when romantic relationships are established, men are influenced by the eating patterns of women (Hasford, Kidwell, & Lopez-Kidwell).

Relationship maintenance 
Daniel Canary from the International Encyclopedia of Marriage describes relationship maintenance as "At the most basic level, relational maintenance refers to a variety of behaviors used by partners in an effort to stay together." Maintaining stability and quality in a relationship is the key to success in a romantic relationship. He says that: "simply staying together is not sufficient; instead, the quality of the relationship is important. For researchers, this means examining behaviors that are linked to relational satisfaction and other indicators of quality." Canary suggests using the work of John Gottman, an American physiologist best known for his research on marital stability for over four decades, serves as a guide for predicting outcomes in relationships because "Gottman emphasizes behaviors that determine whether or not a couple gets divorced".

Furthermore, Canary also uses the source from Stafford and Canary (1991), a journal on Communication Monographs, because they created five great strategies based on maintaining quality in a relationship, the article's strategies are to provide:
Positivity: being joyful and optimistic, not criticizing each other.
Assurances: proving one's commitment and love.
Openness: to be honest with one another according to what they want in the relationship.
Social networks: efforts into involving friends and family in their activities.
Sharing tasks: complementing each other's needs based on daily work.

On relational maintenance, Steven McCornack and Joseph Ortiz, the authors of the book Choices & Connection, state that relationship maintenance "refers to the use of communication behaviors to keep a relationship strong and to ensure that each party continues to draw satisfaction from the relationship".

Physiology
Researchers such as Feeney and Noller question the stability of attachment style across the life span since studies that measured attachment styles at time points ranging from two weeks to eight months found that one out of four adults' attachment style changed. Furthermore, a study by Lopez and Gormley found that attachment styles could change during the first year of college and that changes to more secure attachment styles were associated with adjustments in self-confidence ratings and coping styles. On the other hand, attachment styles in childhood mirror the ones found in adult romantic relationships. In addition, research has shown that building interpersonal connections strengthens neural regulatory systems that are involved in emotions of empathy, enjoyment of positive social events, and stress management, providing evidence that early social interactions affect adult relationships.

Another topic of controversy in the field of romantic relationships is that of domestic abuse. Following the theory that romantic love evolved as a byproduct of survival, it can be said that in some instances, it has turned into a maladaptation. Oxytocin (OT) is a neurophysical hormone produced in the brain. It is known to cause a decrease in stress response. It also can cause an increase in feelings of attachment. In the beginning stages of a romantic relationship, OT levels surge and then remain relatively stable over the duration of the relationship. The higher the surge of OT, the greater the likelihood is of partners staying together. It plays an important role in increasing positive interpersonal behaviors such as trust, altruism, empathy, etc. This response is not universal and can in fact, cause the opposite to occur depending on environment and individual. Individuals ranked high in rejection sensitivity exhibited aggressive tendencies and decreased willingness for cooperation, indicating a link between oxytocin and relationship maintenance.

The feelings associated with romantic love function to ensure the greater reproductive fitness of individuals. The obligations of individuals in romantic relationships to preserve these bonds are based in kin selection theory, where by exhibiting aggressive behavior, a mate can use intimidation and dominance to ward off other potential predators, thus protecting the pair bond and their actual or potential offspring. This has however evolved to the point where it has become detrimental to the fitness of individuals; what is causing attachment to occur in a relationship, is now causing one partner to harm the other.

In the search for the root of intimate partner violence (IPV), intranasal oxytocin was administered to a control group and a group of participants with aggressive tendencies. Participants were then surveyed on how willing they were to engage in five behaviors towards their romantic partner. What they found was that oxytocin increased IPV inclinations only among the participants with a predisposition towards aggressive tendencies. Oxytocin decreases trust and prosocial behavior in individuals with interpersonal difficulties. This, coupled with its role in relationship maintenance, illustrates that oxytocin serves to instill a sense of territoriality and protectiveness towards a mate.

See also 

 Biological basis of love
 Chivalric romance
 Courtly love
 Erotomania
 Erotophobia
 Heterosociality
 Homosociality
 Infatuation
 Interpersonal attraction
 Intimate relationship
 Limerence, the state of mind which arises from romantic attraction
 Love
 Love at first sight
 Lovesickness
 Marriage
 Platonic love
 Romantic friendship
 Romantic comedy
 Romantic orientation
 Romance novel
 Sexual relationship
The Transformation of Intimacy
 Valentine's Day

Romantic practices
 flirting
 fraternizing
 gift-giving
 flowers
 candy
 jewellery
 promise ring
 engagement ring
 wedding ring
 courtship
 pet names
 baby talk
 intimacy
 eye contact
 hugging
 holding hands
 kissing
 love letter

 Dating
 Couple dancing
 Movies
 Serenade

References

Further reading 
 Loudin, Jo, The Hoax of Romance. New York: Prentice Hall, 1980.
 Young-Eisendrath, Polly, You're Not Who I Expected. William Morrow & Company, 1993.
 Kierkegaard, Søren. Stages on Life's Way. Transl. Walter Lowrie, D.D. Princeton: Princeton University Press, 1940.
 Lévi-Strauss, Claude. Structural Anthropology. London: Allen Lane, 1968; New York: Penguin Books, 1994. Structural Anthropology. (volume 2) London: Allen Lane, 1977; New York: Peregrine Books 1976.
 Nietzsche, Friedrich. Human, All Too Human. Transl. R.J. Hollingdale. Cambridge: Cambridge University, 2nd Edition, 1996.
 Wiseman, Boris. Introducing Lévi-Strauss. New York: Totem Books, 1998.
 Denis de Rougemont, Love in the Western World. Pantheon Books, 1956.
 Francesco Alberoni, Falling in love, New York, Random House, 1983.
 Novak, Michael. Shaw, Elizabeth (editor) The Myth of Romantic Love and Other Essays Transaction Publishers (23 January 2013).

External links
 

Love
 
Human sexuality
Philosophy of love
Virtue
Friendship
Emotions
Recurrent elements in fairy tales